Damavand Street is a street in central and eastern Tehran, Iran.

Streets in Tehran